DWSB (89.5 FM), broadcasting as 89.5 Subic Bay Radio, is a public radio station owned and operated by the Subic Bay Metropolitan Authority. affiliate Philippine Broadcasting Service The station's studio and transmitter are located at Bldg. N, Quezon Street, Subic Bay Freeport Zone, Olongapo.

Overview
Established by the Subic Bay Metropolitan Authority (SBMA) jointly with Philippine Broadcasting Service (PBS-BBS), 89.5 FM Subic Bay Radio is aimed to serve as a medium that will promote Subic Bay Freeport Zone as an investment and tourism haven, and at the same time provide radio services for the community of Subic Bay Freeport Zone and its contiguous areas (i.e. Olongapo City and the provinces of Bataan and Zambales).

On 2010, the station's live streaming was in full operation to serve the listeners online here and especially those abroad. Right now it is the only local radio station in Olongapo City and Subic Bay area to have live streaming features operating 24 hours a day.

External links

References

Radio stations in Olongapo
Philippine Broadcasting Service
Radio stations established in 2007